Fredrik Hetty (24 January 1905 – 15 September 1992) was a Norwegian footballer. He played in two matches for the Norway national football team in 1928.

References

External links
 

1905 births
1992 deaths
Norwegian footballers
Norway international footballers
Place of birth missing
Association footballers not categorized by position